Mathias Aaris Kragh Nielsen (born 2 March 1991) is a Danish footballer. He plays at centre-back for NSÍ Runavík. Nielsen has 1 youth cap for Denmark, playing for the Danish under-20s.

A versatile player, Nielsen's preference is playing as a defensive midfielder, though mostly utilized at centre back and occasionally right back.

Early life
Mathias Nielsen spent his entire youth career with Herfølge Boldklub, joining the club at 4 years of age, he went on to sign a contract with this childhood club in the summer of 2007. During the winter he would play indoor football with the team's indoor division, playing as goalkeeper. When Herfølge BK merged with Køge BK, Nielsen was carried over in to the newly formed club HB Køge.

Senior career

F.C. Nordsjælland
1 July 2010 Nielsen moved to Superliga team F.C. Nordsjælland on a free transfer, signing a 1 year contract. He made his debut the following month as a substitute during the second leg of FCN's third qualifying round of the Europa League, against Portuguese side Sporting Lisbon. Amid interest from Italian clubs Parma and Napoli in March 2011, the young defender extended his contract with FCN for another two years.

17 July 2012, Nielsen left FCN for Næstved BK, having made a single appearance for the Farum club.

Næstved BK
After getting his contract with FC Nordsjælland terminated, he joined Danish 2nd Division club Næstved BK. After only a few months in his new club, he got his contract extended until the summer 2015. However, he was sold in 2014.

AC Horsens
AC Horsens announced in July 2014, that they had signed Nielsen. His contract was extended with two years in July 2015 and once again in September 2016, this time until 2019. During his second season in the club, he became the captain of the team.

In March 2017, Nielsen suffered a knee injury and that resulted in aa operation, that kept him out for the rest of the season.

Randers FC
Already in January 2019 it was confirmed, that Nielsen would join Randers FC for the 2019/20 season.

Career statistics

Club

Honours

Club
Nordsjælland
Danish Cup: 2010–11

Randers
Danish Cup: 2020–21

References

External links

 Profile at DBU.dk 
 

1991 births
Living people
Danish men's footballers
Danish expatriate men's footballers
Association football defenders
Herfølge Boldklub players
Køge Boldklub players
FC Nordsjælland players
Viborg FF players
AC Horsens players
Randers FC players
HB Køge players
NSÍ Runavík players
Danish Superliga players
Danish 1st Division players
Expatriate footballers in the Faroe Islands